Julio Peralta and Horacio Zeballos won the title, defeating Guido Andreozzi and Lukas Arnold Ker in the final 6–2, 7–5.

Seeds

Draw

Draw

References
 Main Draw

Copa Fila - Doubles